Mells Road railway station served the village of Mells, Somerset, England from 1875 to 1959 linking Radstock to Frome, Somerset 
on the Heart of Wessex Line.

History 
The station opened as Mells on 1 March 1875 by the Bristol and North Somerset Railway. 'Road' was added to its name on 16 November and 'Halt' was added to its name on 17 September 1956. The station was closed to both passengers and goods traffic on 2 November 1959.

References

External links 

Disused railway stations in Somerset
Former Great Western Railway stations
Railway stations in Great Britain opened in 1875
Railway stations in Great Britain closed in 1959
1875 establishments in England
1959 disestablishments in England